Zuoying is a metro and railway station in Kaohsiung, Taiwan served by Kaohsiung MRT, Taiwan High Speed Rail, and Taiwan Railways, where it is known as Xinzuoying. The station is served by the fastest HSR express services of the 1 series.

Overview
The station is located at the eastern foot of Mt. Panping (also known as Mt. Banping) in Kaohsiung, next to the South East Cement factory buildings. In addition to rail routes, the station is also close to National Highway No. 1, 3, 10 and Provincial Highway No. 1 and 17.

On 15 October 2009, Shin Kong Mitsukoshi won a deal to lease a building at the station and turn it into a shopping complex under a 10-year operate-transfer (OT) contract for NT$505 million (US$15.6 million). The new branch opened at the north-east corner of station on 1 April 2010. In June 2009, a folding bike rental station was set up at the MRT station to facilitate tourism in the city. The station is also equipped with vehicle and motorcycle parking lots.

Structure
The TRA and THSR parts are located in the above ground portion of the station, constructed together and opened for revenue service in January 2007 with the commencement of THSR service. As the current terminus of the line, the THSR part of the station has three island platforms serving six tracks. The TRA part of the station has two platforms serving four tracks, with one additional through track.

The KMRT portion of the station is a two-level station located underground, at the northeastern part of the TRA/THSR station building. The station has two exits and opened for revenue service in March 2008. Dedicated exits between the KMRT station area to the TRA platforms allow direct transfer between TRA and KMRT trains. The KMRT part of the station has an island platform serving two tracks of the KMRT Red line.

HSR services
HSR services 1xx, (1)2xx, (1)3xx, 583, 598, (1)6xx, and (8)8xx call at this station.

Nearby
 Confucius Temple of Kaohsiung
 Lotus Pond, Kaohsiung

See also
 List of railway stations in Taiwan

References

External links
THSR Zuoying Station 
TRA Xinzuoying Station 
Taiwan Railways Administration 
KRTC Zuoying (THSR) Station 

2006 establishments in Taiwan
Railway stations served by Taiwan High Speed Rail
Kaohsiung Metro Red line stations
Railway stations served by Taiwan Railways Administration
Railway stations in Kaohsiung
Railway stations opened in 2006